The moorland chat (Pinarochroa sordida), also known as the alpine chat or hill chat, is a species of songbird in the Old World flycatcher family.  It is endemic to north-east Africa where it is common in its habitat.  It lives at high altitudes on moors and grassland, usually above 3,400 m (11,100 ft), but can live as low as 2,100 m (6,900 ft).  It has a short tail and long legs.  It is bold and will approach people.

The chat was first discovered on Mount Elgon on the Uganda-Kenya border by Jackson. The English geographer Halford Mackinder brought back the same bird from Mount Kenya in 1899. He presented a paper on the first ascent to the Royal Geographical Society in 1900. The scientific results of his expedition were discussed in detail afterwards.

The moorland chat was usually placed in the genus Cercomela, but molecular phylogenetic studies published in 2010 and 2012 found that the species was not closely related to birds in Cercomela or to birds in the closely related genus Oenanthe. The moorland chat was therefore assigned to its own monotypic genus Pinarochroa which had been introduced by the Swedish zoologist Carl Jakob Sundevall in 1872. The genus name Pinarochroa is derived from the Greek word pinaros meaning "dirty" and khroos, khroas meaning "coloured". The specific epithet sordida is from the Latin sordidus meaning "shabby" or "dirty".

Taxonomy

There are a number of recognised subspecies:

 P. s. sordida High altitude moorlands of Ethiopia
 P. s. ernesti North Kenya (Mt. Kenya and Aberdare Mountains)
 P. s. rudolfi North Kenya (Mt. Elgon moorlands) and adjacent East Uganda
 P. s. olimotiensis High altitude moorlands of North Tanzania (Crater Highlands)

References 

Saxicolinae
Birds of East Africa
moorland chat